Praz may refer to:

Places
La Praz, Vaud, Switzerland
Le Praz, Courchevel, Savoie, France,
Präz, Graubünden, Switzerland
Les Praz, Chamonix, France

Names
Mario Praz (1896–1982), Italian-born critic of art and literature, and a scholar of English literature
A common misspelling of Pras, American rapper (born 1972)

Franco-Provençal-language surnames